The arrondissement of Saint-Flour is an arrondissement of France in the Cantal department in the Auvergne-Rhône-Alpes region. It has 98 communes.

Composition 

The communes of the arrondissement of Saint-Flour, and their INSEE codes, are:
 
 Albepierre-Bredons (15025)
 Allanche (15001)
 Alleuze (15002)
 Andelat (15004)
 Anglards-de-Saint-Flour (15005)
 Anterrieux (15007)
 Auriac-l'Église (15013)
 Bonnac (15022)
 Brezons (15026)
 Celoux (15032)
 Cézens (15033)
 Chaliers (15034)
 Chanterelle (15040)
 La Chapelle-d'Alagnon (15041)
 La Chapelle-Laurent (15042)
 Charmensac (15043)
 Chaudes-Aigues (15045)
 Chazelles (15048)
 Cheylade (15049)
 Le Claux (15050)
 Clavières (15051)
 Coltines (15053)
 Condat (15054)
 Coren (15055)
 Cussac (15059)
 Deux-Verges (15060)
 Dienne (15061)
 Espinasse (15065)
 Ferrières-Saint-Mary (15069)
 Fridefont (15073)
 Gourdièges (15077)
 Jabrun (15078)
 Joursac (15080)
 Lacapelle-Barrès (15086)
 Landeyrat (15091)
 Lastic (15097)
 Laurie (15098)
 Laveissenet (15100)
 Laveissière (15101)
 Lavigerie (15102)
 Leyvaux (15105)
 Lieutadès (15106)
 Lorcières (15107)
 Lugarde (15110)
 Malbo (15112)
 Marcenat (15114)
 Marchastel (15116)
 Massiac (15119)
 Maurines (15121)
 Mentières (15125)
 Molèdes (15126)
 Molompize (15127)
 Montboudif (15129)
 Montchamp (15130)
 Montgreleix (15132)
 Murat (15138)
 Narnhac (15139)
 Neussargues en Pinatelle (15141)
 Neuvéglise-sur-Truyère (15142)
 Paulhac (15148)
 Paulhenc (15149)
 Peyrusse (15151)
 Pierrefort (15152)
 Pradiers (15155)
 Rageade (15158)
 Rézentières (15161)
 Roffiac (15164)
 Ruynes-en-Margeride (15168)
 Saint-Amandin (15170)
 Saint-Bonnet-de-Condat (15173)
 Sainte-Marie (15198)
 Saint-Flour (15187)
 Saint-Georges (15188)
 Saint-Martial (15199)
 Saint-Martin-sous-Vigouroux (15201)
 Saint-Mary-le-Plain (15203)
 Saint-Poncy (15207)
 Saint-Rémy-de-Chaudes-Aigues (15209)
 Saint-Saturnin (15213)
 Saint-Urcize (15216)
 Ségur-les-Villas (15225)
 Soulages (15229)
 Talizat (15231)
 Tanavelle (15232)
 Les Ternes (15235)
 Tiviers (15237)
 La Trinitat (15241)
 Ussel (15244)
 Vabres (15245)
 Val-d'Arcomie (15108)
 Valjouze (15247)
 Valuéjols (15248)
 Védrines-Saint-Loup (15251)
 Vernols (15253)
 Vèze (15256)
 Vieillespesse (15259)
 Villedieu (15262)
 Virargues (15263)

History

The arrondissement of Saint-Flour was created in 1800.

As a result of the reorganisation of the cantons of France which came into effect in 2015, the borders of the cantons are no longer related to the borders of the arrondissements. The cantons of the arrondissement of Saint-Flour were, as of January 2015:

 Allanche
 Chaudes-Aigues
 Condat
 Massiac
 Murat
 Pierrefort
 Ruynes-en-Margeride
 Saint-Flour-Nord
 Saint-Flour-Sud

References

Saint-Flour